Peter King Lourie (born in Michigan, United States) is an author of nonfiction books for adults and children.

Biography

Born in Ann Arbor, Michigan, Lourie graduated from Collegiate School in New York City.  He received his bachelor's degree in classics from NYU, an MA in English Literature at the University of Maine, and an MFA in nonfiction writing at Columbia University.  He has taught at Columbia College, University of Vermont, University of Maine, and Middlebury College where he teaches environmental and adventure/travel writing & digital storytelling. He is a member of the Society of Environmental Journalists, and in 2019 was elected a Fellow at the Explorers Club.  Lourie is married with two children.

Bibliography
Locked in Ice! Nansen’s Daring Quest for the North Pole
Jack London and the Klondike Gold Rush
The Polar Bear Scientists (Scientists in the Field series)
The Manatee Scientists: Saving Vulnerable Species (Scientists in the Field series)
Writing to Explore: Discovering Adventure in the Research Paper, 3-8
Whaling Season: A Year in the Life of an Arctic Whale Scientist (Scientists in the Field series)
On the Texas Trail of Cabeza de Vaca
Arctic Thaw: The People of the Whale in a Changing Climate
Hidden World of the Aztec
Lost Treasures of the Inca
The Mystery of the Maya
First Dive to Shark Dive
The Lost World of the Anasazi
Tierra del Fuego: A Journey to the End of the Earth
Amazon: A Journey Through the Last Frontier
On the Trail of Lewis and Clark: A journey up the Missouri River
Erie Canal: Canoeing America's Great Waterway
Everglades: Buffalo Tiger and the River of Grass
Hudson River: An Adventure from the Mountains to the Sea
Mississippi River: A journey Down the Father of Waters
Rio Grande: From the Rocky Mountains to the Gulf of Mexico
On the Trail of Sacagawea
Yukon River: An Adventure to the Gold Fields of the Klondike
The Lost Treasure of Captain Kid (novel)
River of Mountains: A Canoe Journey Down the Hudson (nonfiction for adults)
Sweat of the Sun, Tears of the Moon: A Chronicle of an Incan Treasure (nonfiction for adults)

External links
Official website

Icebreaker Stories
Arctic Stories website

1952 births
Writers from Ann Arbor, Michigan
Living people
New York University alumni
University of Maine alumni
Columbia University School of the Arts alumni
Middlebury College faculty